Volontaires is a football (soccer) club from Kanyosha, Burundi.

The team currently plays in the Burundi Premier League.

League participations
Burundi Premier League: 2013–
Burundi Second Division: ????–2013

Stadium
Currently the team plays at the 1,000 capacity Stade Kanyosha.

References

External links
Soccerway
Footballdatabase

Football clubs in Burundi